Dr. Najma Afzal Khan (born 1 October 1950) is a Pakistani politician, doctor and philanthropist who was a Member of the Provincial Assembly of the Punjab, from May 2013 to May 2018. She has also founded and run various charitable organizations to help impoverished young people.

Early life and education
She was born on 1 October 1950 in Faisalabad.

She earned a degree of Bachelor of Medicine and Bachelor of Surgery in 1976 from the Liaquat University of Medical and Health Sciences.

Medical and Business career

Khan helped found the Saahil Group, a healthcare, energy, manufacturing, and real estate company, with her husband, Rana Afzal Khan. She established Saahil Hospital in Faisalabad.

Political career

She was elected to the Provincial Assembly of the Punjab as a candidate of Pakistan Muslim League (N) on a reserved seat for women in 2013 Pakistani general election.

She was married to Rana Afzal Khan, PML-N leader and Minister of Finance and Economic Affairs in the Abassi Cabinet, until his death on the 27th of September, 2019.

Awards and recognition 

Khan has won approximately 50 awards for her Medical and Charitable Work.

References

Living people
Punjab MPAs 2013–2018
1952 births
Pakistan Muslim League (N) politicians
Women members of the Provincial Assembly of the Punjab
21st-century Pakistani women politicians